Andrew Hurley may refer to:

 Andy Hurley (born 1980), drummer of the Chicago-based alternative rock band Fall Out Boy
 Andrew Hurley (academic), English translator of Spanish literature
 Andrew Michael Hurley (born 1975), English novelist
 Andrew Crowther Hurley (born 1926, died 1988), Quantum chemist and Mathematician